Famous Players Limited Partnership is a Canadian-based subsidiary of Cineplex Entertainment. As an independent company, it existed as a film exhibitor and cable television service provider. Famous Players operated numerous movie theatre locations in Canada from British Columbia to Newfoundland and Labrador. The company was owned by Viacom Canada but was sold to Cineplex Galaxy LP (now Cineplex Entertainment) in 2005.

The Famous Players brand name and its sub-banners continued to be used in the majority of its theatres until 2022 when Cineplex phased out the name in favour of the "Cineplex Cinemas" banner, although the SilverCity name continues to be used. Prior to its retirement, Famous Players operated its theatres under its traditional namesake, SilverCity, Paramount, Coliseum, and Colossus brands.

History

Beginnings
Famous Players Canadian Corporation dates back to the early days of Famous Players Film Company (later Paramount Pictures), founded in 1912, as its earliest predecessor, though that company did not have any operations in Canada until 1920, when it bought Nathan Nathanson's Paramount Theatre chain, which Nathanson had established four years earlier. Nathanson, along with being the 5th richest person in the world, became the first president of the resulting entity, Famous Players Canadian Corporation Limited. In 1923, Famous Players bought out rival Allen Theatres, acquiring many buildings in the process. The Famous Players Theatres chain was always strongly linked with Paramount, and was a wholly owned subsidiary of Paramount Communications at the time that firm was acquired by Viacom in 1994. Some of the most high-profile and popular theatres in the Famous Players chain were the Imperial and the Uptown in Toronto, and the Capitol, Orpheum, Stanley, and Strand in Vancouver.

Originally began with 13 theatres located in Ontario and British Columbia, the company quickly expanded its holdings to 100 by the end of 1926. Until the 1950s, the company continued to build its operations in the movie theatre sector.

In 1952, however, Famous Players began to invest in the new technology. First, the company purchased the rights to a coinbox system that connected to television sets. A year later, it purchased its first broadcasting assets, CKCO-TV in Kitchener, Ontario and CFCM-TV in Quebec City.

At the end of the 1950s, the company acquired the first of many cable TV companies it would come to own, thus adding control over the distribution of its TV product. As the industry grew, starting in the mid-1960s, so did the assets of Famous Players in this segment. In 1971, the company sold off the majority of its shareholdings in its movie theatre and other non-TV-related entertainment holdings to Gulf + Western Canada and subsequently changed its name to Canadian Cablesystems Limited, reflecting the new focus of its operations. Canadian Cablesystems was the owner and operator of Metro Cable, which served parts of Metro Toronto, as well as a minority shareholder in several other cable companies, until it was purchased by Rogers Cablesystems Ltd. in 1978.

Most famously, Famous Players Theatres allowed the lease on a property containing the entrance of one of its flagship Toronto locations, the Imperial Six, to lapse in 1986. Cineplex immediately took over the lease, denying Famous Players Theatres access to the portion of the property that they already owned outright. Famous Players eventually sold its property to Cineplex Odeon Cinemas, on the condition it never again be used to show filmed entertainment.  Cineplex's live-theatre division renovated the theatre; renamed the Pantages Theatre, it hosted The Phantom of the Opera for ten years.  The theatre was renamed the Canon in 2001 and then again in 2011 as the Ed Mirvish Theatre, which it is currently known, in honour of the popular businessman and ironically Mr. Drabinsky's main competitor in live theatre in Toronto.

Growth and challenges
Famous Players expanded throughout the 1990s. 

In 1993 Barbara Turnbull made a complaint with the Ontario Human Rights Commission over lack of accessibility in cinemas operated by Famous Players; in 2001 the commission ruled in her favor, however two cinemas were closed instead of made fully accessible.

Under chairman John Bailey, Famous Players re-built its infrastructure from 1996 to 2003 with new "megaplex" theatre brands featuring stadium seating, such as SilverCity and Coliseum, with food courts and video games. Around that time, AMC Theatres entered the Canadian market, and most of the traditional ties between the existing chains and the major studios began to unwind, putting all three chains in full-on competition in several major markets.

The company once operated a number of drive-in theatres, but most have been closed and replaced with modern theatres. Until 2004, it operated theatres in the Maritimes, none of which were branded-concept theatres; these were sold to the region's dominant exhibitor, Empire Theatres.

Sale to Cineplex Galaxy and aftermath
In February 2005, Viacom announced the sale of Famous Players for $400 million. Cineplex Galaxy, controlled by Onex Corporation acquired Famous Players from Viacom for $500 million (about US$397 million) in June 2005, with the deal being completed on July 22. To satisfy antitrust concerns, on August 22, 2005, the group announced the sale of 27 locations in Ontario and western Canada to Empire Theatres. Cineplex re-acquired the former Famous Players locations in Atlantic Canada that were owned by Empire when it began to shut down operations in 2013.

In December 2019, UK-based Cineworld plans to acquire the now renamed Cineplex Entertainment which will see the former 47 Famous Players theatres into the fold. The sale will make Cineworld the largest cinema chain in North America with the ownership of Regal Cinemas. The company stated that Cineplex's operations were to be integrated with Regal and that it planned to reach $120 million in cost efficiencies and revenue synergies including the adoption of a subscription service scheme similar to Regal and Cineworld.

The deal between Cineworld and Cineplex Entertainment fell through due to breaches in agreement and the effects of the COVID-19 pandemic in June 2020.

As of January 2023, only three theatres in Lasalle, Prince George and Prince Rupert remain open under the Famous Players brand. However, the corporate entity, Famous Players LP, remains nominally active as a subsidiary of Cineplex.

Assets

Famous Players theatres
At its peak, Famous Players operated 101 theatres in 2003 with 882 screens. In 2011, a total of 10 locations used the Famous Players brand. Most of these have since closed, or they were rebranded by Cineplex.

Famous Players Pickering Town Centre opened in 1989 at the Pickering Town Centre and was renovated in 1998. It featured traditional movie screens and a small Cinescape arcade. It closed in 2018 and was replaced by Cineplex Cinemas Pickering and VIP at the same shopping centre, occupying some of the space of the former Target. This new Cineplex location features an UltraAVX theatre, an Xscape Entertainment Centre with party rooms, and a VIP Cinemas licensed lounge.

Famous Players Canada Square Cinemas opened in 1985 and was the last theatre operating in Ontario under the brand, located at the intersection of Yonge and Eglinton. The multiplex opened as a Cineplex Odeon and was a local favourite for its retro feel and independent film showings. It was acquired by Famous Players in 2001 due to expansion limitations at the company's nearby SilverCity Yonge and Eglinton. In 2005, Cineplex acquired both theatres, with the SilverCity location being its main focus. The SilverCity is now known as Cineplex Cinemas Yonge-Eglinton and VIP, and the Famous Players closed on October 24, 2021.

Famous Players Kildonan Place Cinemas opened in 1989 and was the last theatre operating in Manitoba under the brand. It featured six traditional movie screens and a small Cineplex arcade. It closed on December 5, 2022, with Cineplex Junxion Kildonan Place replacing this location at the same shopping centre on December 8, 2022. The latter is the first Cineplex Junxion location to open in Canada.

Other theatres

Prior to merging with Cineplex, Famous Players operated five theatre brands: Famous Players, SilverCity, Coliseum, Colossus and Paramount. Of these, Cineplex only preserved the first two brands, which amount to 20 locations as of 2019. The Coliseum and Colossus theatres sold to Cineplex were renamed to Cineplex Cinemas, though the unique features of the original brands were preserved. Similarly, Paramount theatres now use the Scotiabank Theatre brand since 2007.

In addition, Landmark Cinemas also acquired many of the Famous Players theatres that were formerly operated by Empire Theatres.

Many theatres had served Pepsi products in addition to popcorn with restaurants such as Burger King, New York Fries, Wetzel's Pretzels, Taco Bell, TCBY, Baskin Robbins and Starbucks. Those were heavily replaced by Coca-Cola and Outtakes with some theatres retaining Starbucks.

Television stations
CKCO-TV – Kitchener, Ontario 
CFCM-TV – Quebec City, Quebec

See also
List of Cineplex Entertainment movie theatres
Paramount Canada's Wonderland, an amusement park owned by Paramount from 1993 to 2006
Paramount Theatre (Edmonton), originally owned by Famous Players Theatres
Blockbuster LLC, also owned by Viacom

Notes

References

Further reading
 Cineplex Galaxy buying Famous Players movie chain from Viacom for $500 million – CBC News

External links
 Famous Players Theatres website (redirects to the Cineplex website)
 List of FP theatres (incomplete)

1920 establishments in Ontario
Movie theatre chains in Canada
Movie theatre chains in the United States
Defunct cable and DBS companies of Canada
Companies based in Toronto
Entertainment companies of Canada
Entertainment companies established in 1920
Mass media companies established in 1920
Communications in Ontario
Former Viacom subsidiaries
Cineplex Entertainment
Canadian companies established in 1920

fr:Famous Players